The I.Ae.32 Chingolo (named after the South American bird) was a civil trainer, touring and aerobatic aircraft developed in Argentina in the 1940s. It was designed by Sandro Gorissenso and developed by the Instituto Aerotécnico for manufacture by the company “Mario Vicente Construcciones Aeronáuticas” in Córdoba Province as an initiative under President Juan Perón's first five year plan.

Design and development
The design, which shared some of the technical characteristics of the earlier I.Ae. 31 Colibrí, was a conventional low-wing cantilever monoplane with and had fixed tailwheel undercarriage; seating a student pilot (or passenger) and instructor (or pilot) in a tandem enclosed cockpit. Only one prototype was built.

Specifications

See also
 I.Ae. 31 Colibrí

References
 
 Bridgeman, Leonard. Jane's All The World's Aircraft 1950-1951 edition New York: The Mcgraw. Hill Book Company, Inc, 1950 Pg.9c (No ISBN)

Further reading

External links 

 Crónicas y testimonios – Fábrica Militar de Aviones

1940s Argentine civil trainer aircraft
FMA aircraft
Low-wing aircraft
Single-engined tractor aircraft
Aircraft first flown in 1949